Erik Qualman is an American author of Socialnomics, which according to WorldCat, is held in 1090 libraries.  He is also the author  of  Digital Leader,What Happens in Vegas Stays on YouTube and The Focus Project . In 2010, Socialnomics was a Book of the Year finalist as voted on by the American Marketing Association. In 2012 he was a finalist for the "Most Likeable Author Award" alongside Seth Godin and JK Rowling.

Biography
Qualman is from Rochester Hills, Michigan, and received a BA in marketing from Michigan State University. He also holds an MBA from the McCombs School of Business at the University of Texas. Qualman delivered the commencement address to the McCombs graduating class of 2011. Lake Superior State University awarded Qualman an honorary doctorate for his work and accomplishments in the field of digital leadership.

Career
Aside from being an author, Qualman is also a professional keynote speaker. Prior to his writing and speaking career Qualman worked in online marketing and eBusiness functions at Cadillac & Pontiac (1994 to 1997), AT&T (1998 to 2000), Yahoo (2000 to 2003), EarthLink (2003 to 2005) and Travelzoo (Head of Marketing 2005 to 2008). Qualman was a professor at the Hult International Business School.

In 2021 Qualman became the first male speaker to address the audience at the Indy Women in Tech Summit. Qualman delivered the keynote address at IBM's 2013 Business Connect in Milan, Italy. He was a featured speaker at BookExpo America 2009, presenting to those in attendance on how social media is transforming the way people live and do business.  Qualman also was the keynote speaker at Europe's Fiber To The Home (FTTH) Council Meeting in Lisbon,.

He has been written about in Mashable, BusinessWeek, The New York Times, Forbes, and The Huffington Post
He has also been interviewed on radio and television discussing his view on digital trends.

Awards and recognition
Top 25 Communications Professors on Twitter (source: Stukent) 
Top 50 Social Media Influencer (source: Forbes)

Books
Socialnomics
Digital Leader
What Happens in Vegas Stays on YouTube
What Happens on Campus Stays on YouTube
The Focus Project

References

Living people
1972 births
Michigan State University alumni
McCombs School of Business alumni
American male writers
Social media influencers